The Royal Watercolour Society is a British institution of painters working in watercolours. The Society is a centre of excellence for water-based media on paper, which allows for a diverse and interesting range of approaches to the medium of watercolour. Its members, or associates, use the postnominal initials RWS. They are elected by the membership, with typically half a dozen new associates joining the Society each year.

History
The society was founded as the Society of Painters in Water Colours in 1804 by William Frederick Wells. Its original membership was William Sawrey Gilpin, Robert Hills, John Claude Nattes, John Varley, Cornelius Varley, Francis Nicholson, Samuel Shelley, William Henry Pyne and Nicholas Pocock. The members seceded from the Royal Academy where they felt that their work commanded insufficient respect and attention.

In 1812, the Society reformed as the Society of Painters in Oil and Watercolours, reverting to its original name in 1820.

In 1831 a schism created another group, the New Society for Painters in Water Colours, and so the 1804 group became known as the Old Water Colour Society, and just the Old Society. The New Society subsequently became the Royal Institute of Painters in Water Colours, which still exists today.

The Old Society obtained its Royal charter 1881 under the presidency of Sir John Gilbert as the Royal Society of Painters in Water Colours. In 1988, it changed its name again to the Royal Watercolour Society, by which it had always previously been generally known.

Current
The Royal Watercolour Society was founded to promote watercolour as a medium in all its applications. The Society defines a 'watercolour' as a work made in any water-based paint on paper. The RWS holds regular exhibitions presenting the finest in British contemporary works on paper. Exhibitions are held at Bankside Gallery and also tour outside London. The 75 Members choose new Associates each year in a rigorous election procedure. Full membership is granted following a show of hands at an AGM. The Society's education programme includes practical courses tutored by members and drop-in family event days as well as talks and discussions. The archive and diploma collection is available for research.

Current members include Sonia Lawson, Elizabeth Blackadder, Richard Bawden and David Remfry.

The current president Jill Leman was elected in 2017.

Presidents 

William Sawrey Gilpin (1804–1806)
William Frederick Wells (1806–1807)
John Glover (1808)
Ramsay Richard Reinagle (1808–1812)
Francis Nicholson (1812–1813)
John Warwick Smith (1814)
John Glover (1815)
Joshua Cristall (1816)
John Warwick Smith (1817–1818)
Joshua Cristall (1819)
George Fennell Robson (1820)
Joshua Cristall (1821–1831)
Anthony Van Dyke Copley Fielding (1831–1855)
John Frederick Lewis (1856–1858)
John Frederick Tayler (1858–1870)
Sir John Gilbert (1871–1897)
Sir Ernest Waterlow (1897–1913)
Alfred Parsons (1913–1920)
Sir Herbert Hughes-Stanton (1920–1936)
Sir William Russell Flint (1936–1956)
Robert Austin (1957–1973)
Andrew Freeth (1974–1976)
Ernest Greenwood (1976–1984)
Maurice Sheppard (1984–1987)
Charles Bartlett (1987–1992)
Leslie Worth (1992–1995)
Richard Seddon (1995–1996)
John Doyle (1996–2000)
Francis Bowyer (2000–2003)
Trevor Frankland (2003–2006)
Richard Sorrell (2006–2009)
David Paskett (2009–2012)
Thomas Plunkett (2012–2017)
Jill Leman (2017–present)

Bibliography

References

External links

British artist groups and collectives
19th-century art groups
1804 establishments in the United Kingdom
British contemporary art
Watercolor societies
Water